Auberives-sur-Varèze is a commune in the Isère department in the Auvergne-Rhône-Alpes region of south-eastern France.

The inhabitants of the commune are known as Auberivois or Auberivoises.

Geography
Auberives-sur-Varèze is located some 14 km south by south-west of Vienne and 6 km north-east of Saint-Maurice-l'Exil. Access to the commune is by Route nationale 7 from Vienne in the north which passes through the length of the commune and the town before continuing south to Le Péage-de-Roussillon. The D37 road comes from Cheyssieu in the east passing through the commune north of the village and continuing to Saint-Prim in the north-west. The A7 autoroute (E15) also passes through the east of the commune but there is no exit in or near the commune. There is a belt of forest through the centre of the commune just north of the town while the rest of the commune is farmland apart from the large residential area of the town.

The Varèze river flows through the centre of the commune from east to west to join the Rhône at Saint-Alban-du-Rhône. The Canal du Moulin branches from the Varèze in the east of the commune and continues west south of and parallel to it. The  flows from the west north of the Varèze and joins it in the east of the commune.

Neighbouring communes and villages

History
The history of Auberives is very old as for the neighbouring communes in the north of the canton. The name Auberives comes from the Latin Ripa Alba meaning "White Shore" due to the presence in the soil of kaolin which was formerly used by potters.

The oldest vestige is the "Great Borne": a boulder rolled by glaciers to the crossroads of the communes of Roussillon at Assieu, and Auberives at Ville on Anjou.

In the 11th century the area was covered with a vast forest populated mostly by deer and wild boar. In the 12th century there was wolf hunting which activity would have given its name to the forest of Louze. At the end of the 11th century the Lord of Auberives was a knight, vassal of Roussillon, called Angérius. At the beginning of the 15th century the Lord of Auberives was Louis II of Chalon-Arlay, Prince of Orange, and an ally of the Duke of Burgundy. At the time of the Battle of Anthon on 11 June 1430, the castle was besieged and dismantled by Raoul de Gaucourt, governor of Dauphiné. Since then the castle has been a ruin. A remaining section of wall partially encloses the current cemetery.

Auberives has carried many names: Auberives de Vienne, Auberives de Roussillon, and finally Auberives-sur-Varèze from the name of the river.

Louis Mandrin, the smuggler, passed through while moving around the region. He had a hideout at Reventin (4 km away).

With a surface of 704 hectares and despite the strong decrease in the number of farmers, Auberives has always been a predominantly agricultural commune with the meadows and woods of the Varèze, significant areas of fruit trees, and with a few fields preserving traditional cultures.

Administration

List of Successive Mayors

Demography
In 2017 the commune had 1,484 inhabitants.

Sites and monuments
A Church from the 19th century

See also
Communes of the Isère department

References

External links
Auberives-sur-Varèze on Géoportail, National Geographic Institute (IGN) website 
Auberive on the 1750 Cassini Map

Communes of Isère
Dauphiné